Leonardo Gomes da Conceição Silva (born 30 June 1996), known as just Leonardo Gomes, is a Brazilian footballer who plays for Grêmio as a right back.

Club career
Born in Araguaína, Tocantins, Leonardo Gomes finished his formation with Vila Nova. He made his senior debut for the club on 2 June 2013, coming on as a late substitute in a 3–1 Série C home win against Grêmio Barueri.

Leonardo Gomes became a starter for Vila Nova during the 2014 campaign, and scored his first goal on 30 September of that year in a 5–1 home loss against Ceará. On 24 December 2014 he was sold to Cruzeiro, being immediately loaned to Boa Esporte.

On 12 January 2017, after being crowned champions of 2016 Campeonato Brasileiro Série C with Boa, Leonardo Gomes signed for Grêmio.

Honours
Boa Esporte
Campeonato Brasileiro Série C: 2016

Grêmio
Copa Libertadores: 2017
Recopa Sudamericana: 2018
Campeonato Gaúcho: 2018, 2019, 2021
Recopa Gaúcha: 2019

References

External links

1996 births
Living people
Sportspeople from Tocantins
Brazilian footballers
Association football defenders
Campeonato Brasileiro Série A players
Campeonato Brasileiro Série B players
Campeonato Brasileiro Série C players
Vila Nova Futebol Clube players
Cruzeiro Esporte Clube players
Boa Esporte Clube players
Grêmio Foot-Ball Porto Alegrense players